The Fulton Opera House, also known as the Fulton Theatre or simply The Fulton, is a League of Regional Theatres class B regional theater located in historic downtown Lancaster, Pennsylvania. It is reportedly the oldest working theatre in the United States.  It was designated a National Historic Landmark in 1964.

Building
Fulton Hall is named after Robert Fulton (1765-1815), Lancaster County's steam engine pioneer, and it is his likeness that is portrayed in the statue on the front facade. This statue is a replica of the original wooden statue, which has since been restored and now resides on display inside the interior lobby. The building itself was built on the foundation of Lancaster's pre-Revolutionary jail. In 1763, a vigilante gang known as the Paxton Boys massacred the Conestoga Indians being held there for their protection. This was a monumental event throughout the colonies and became the subject matter for the first plays ever written on American soil - "A Dialogue Between Andrew Trueman and Thomas Zealot About the Killing the Indians at Cannestogoe and Lancaster" and "The Paxton Boys, a Farce". The exterior wall of the jail courtyard is now the back wall of the theatre.
Christopher Hager, a Lancaster merchant and civic leader, commissioned the renowned Philadelphia architect Samuel Sloan  (who later designed the Lancaster County Courthouse) to create a building that would serve as a community center for meetings, lectures, concerts, and theatrical performances. The building was erected in 1852.

The Fulton Theatre was later modified by noted theatrical architect Edwin Forrest Durang, is one of only three theatres recognized as National Historic Landmarks (the others are the Walnut Street Theatre in Philadelphia and the Goldenrod Showboat in St. Louis, Missouri). 
The 1959 production of Our Town, starring Jeanne Clemson, marked that first time that a live theater production had been performed at the Fulton Opera House in thirty years.

Operation
A founding member of the League of Historic American Theatres (LHAT), the Fulton is operated by the Fulton Theatre Company, a non-profit organization.

As the Fulton is run on a non-profit basis, it depends on a variety of grants, corporate sponsorship, and private donations to accomplish its mission. The Fulton is an Equity House, operating under agreement with the Actor's Equity Association and the Union for Professional Actors and Stage Managers (which essentially means that its actors and production team are paid per collective bargaining agreements, as opposed to non-equity actors who are not paid per collective bargaining agreements or volunteers) and employs members of the Stage Directors and Choreographers Society and the United Scenic Artists.  The Fulton is also a member of ASSITEJ, the International Association of Theatre for Children and Young People.

The Fulton Theatre is home to six mainstage productions per year including previous productions of Disney's Newsies, In The Heights, Agatha Christie's The Mousetrap, some of which are world premier originals (critically acclaimed Lightning Rod, 2005); four family series productions, including the Fulton's own 'Twas the Night Before Christmas, Aladdin, Jack and the Beanstalk, the Musical, and other theatre for young audiences productions; and four studio series productions, including the Pulitzer Prize-winning drama Disgraced, along with other riveting productions like Venus in Fur, Veronica's Room and Other Desert Cities. Although most casting takes place in New York City, regional auditions are also held.  While many of The Fulton's regulars are Lancaster County natives who are delighted at the chance to return home to perform, nearly all quickly fall in love with the "Grand Old Lady" and her charm.

In addition to providing a place of employment for professional actors, the Fulton Theatre Company is a complete production facility which employs full-time carpenters, electricians, scenic artists, painters, composers, lighting and sound technicians.  Most set pieces and costumes are created in-house or at an adjacent workshop, and makeup, hair, and wigs are created by a full-time designer.  The Fulton also maintains a costume shop which provides access to professional quality costumes and props to schools, community theatre companies, and other organizations throughout the region.  Its marketing department maintains a website that allows users to browse theatre history, check audition times, and purchase tickets. All posters and print materials, including production programs, are cataloged and archived by the Lancaster Historical Society.

Many famous actors have appeared at the Fulton.  In December 1930 Basil Rathbone appeared as Christian St. Obin in A Kiss of Importance.  Peter Weir's film, "Witness," starring Harrison Ford and Kelly McGillis, much of which represents the lifestyle of the Amish, premiered here in February, 1985.

See also
List of National Historic Landmarks in Pennsylvania
National Register of Historic Places listings in Lancaster County, Pennsylvania

References
 Who's Who in the Theatre, edited by John Parker, tenth edition, revised, London, 1947, p. 1184.

External links

Building history
Listing and photographs at Philadelphia Architects and Buildings

Buildings and structures in Lancaster, Pennsylvania
Culture of Lancaster, Pennsylvania
History of Lancaster, Pennsylvania
Music venues completed in 1852
Theatres completed in 1852
National Historic Landmarks in Pennsylvania
Opera houses in Pennsylvania
Theatres in Pennsylvania
Theatres on the National Register of Historic Places in Pennsylvania
Tourist attractions in Lancaster, Pennsylvania
1852 establishments in Pennsylvania
National Register of Historic Places in Lancaster, Pennsylvania
Opera houses on the National Register of Historic Places
Event venues on the National Register of Historic Places in Pennsylvania